This is a list of bridges in North Korea.

Pyongyang
Six bridges over the Taedong River, in order west to east
 1. Chungsong Bridge (충성의 다리) with off-ramp to Ssuk Islet and Turu Island
 2. Yanggak Bridge (양각교) with off-ramp to Yanggak Island
 3. Taedong Bridge (대동교) 1905
 4. Okryu Bridge (옥류교)
 5. Rungna Bridge (릉라교) passing through Rungna Island
 6. Chongryu Bridge (청류교) passing through Rungna Island
 7. Taedong River Bridge, outside Pyongyang upstream.

Inland
 Sonjuk Bridge (선죽교), Kaesong 1290AD
 Bridge of No Return (돌아오지 않는 다리)

Border bridges

With China
 New Yalu River Bridge (신압록강대교), 2011 - roads on North Korean side not connected
 Sino–Korean Friendship Bridge (조중우의교)
 Linjiang Yalu River Bridge 린장
 Changbai–Hyesan International Bridge (혜장교)
 Tumen Border Bridge, Tumen
 Tumen River Bridge, Hunchun

With Russia
 North Korea Russia Rail Bridge

See also
List of bridges
List of tunnels in North Korea

 
Bridges
North Korea
Bridges